= 2008 Brazilian federal budget =

2008
- Submitted: 5 September 2007
- Submitted by: Luiz Inácio Lula da Silva
- Submitted to: National Congress of Brazil
- Total revenue: R$1.4 trillion
- Total expenditures: R$1.4 trillion

The 2008 Brazilian federal budget was submitted to the National Congress of Brazil by President Luiz Inácio Lula da Silva on 5 September 2007.

== Total receipts ==
The total receipts for fiscal year 2008 are estimated at R$1.4 trillion (all values below are given in Brazilian Real).

- Primary receipts: $682.7 billion
  - $448.7 billion - Federal taxes and tributes
  - $157 billion - Social security contributions
  - $77 billion - Other
- Financial income: $669.7 billion
- State enterprises: $62 billion

== Total expenses ==
The total expenses for 2008 amount to $1.4 trillion.

- Mandatory spending: $502.1 billion
  - $114.9 billion - Transfers to States and Municipalities
  - $130.8 billion - Payroll
  - $198.7 billion - Social security
  - $34.4 billion - Unemployment and other welfare benefits
  - $3.9 billion - Export subsidy
  - $19.4 billion - Other mandatory expenses
- Discretionary spending: $129.6 billion
- Financial spending: $720.9 billion
  - $504.5 billion - Public debt amortization
  - $152.2 billion - Public debt interest
  - $64.2 billion - Other financial expenses
- Investments in State enterprises: $62 billion
